Beautiful Love, Wonderful Life is a 2019–2020 South Korean television series starring Seol In-ah, Kim Jae-young, Jo Yoon-hee, Yoon Park and Oh Min-suk. The series aired on KBS2 every Saturday and Sunday from 19:55 to 21:15 (KST) from September 28, 2019 to March 22, 2020.

Synopsis
This is a story about love and deception.  The deceptions come in every form - outright lies, obfuscations, failure to speak up, misleading silence, misdirection, rampant insincerity. Against this tidal wave, the main characters fight to find happiness. Their battles never fail to engage.

Cast

Main
 Seol In-ah as Kim Cheong-ah
 Kim Jae-young as Goo Joon-hwi
 Jo Yoon-hee as Kim Seol-ah
 Yoon Park as Moon Tae-rang
 Oh Min-suk as Do Jin-woo

Supporting
 Kim Mi-sook as Sunwoo Yeong-ae
 Park Yeong-gyu as Kim Yeong-woong
 Jo Yoo-jung as Kim Yeon-ah
 Ok Ye-rin as (young) Yeon-ah
 Kwon Eun-bin as Kim Yeon-ah (left the show)
 Na Young-hee as Hong Yoo-ra
 Park Hae-mi as Hong Hwa-yeong
 Jung Won-joong as Moon Joon-ik
 Jo Woo-ri as Moon Hae-rang
 Ryu Ui-hyun as Moon Pa-rang
 Kim Jin-yeop as Baek Rim
 Lee Tae-sun as Kang Shi-wol
 Park Yeong-soo as Na Tae-pyeong
 Kim Bo-jung as Oh Deok-hee
 Jin Ho-eun as Goo Joon-gyeom

Special appearances
 Yoo Jae-suk as Happy Together host (Ep. 2)
 Jun Hyun-moo as Happy Together host (Ep. 2)
 Kim Da-som as a mysterious actress (Ep. 3)
 Oh Jung-yeon as Bae Hyeon-ji (Ep. 3)
 Seol Jung-hwan as a reporter

Original soundtrack

Part 1

Part 2

Part 3

Part 4

Part 5

Part 6

Part 7

Part 8

Part 9

Part 10

Part 11

Part 12

Part 13

Viewership
 In this table,  represent the lowest ratings and  represent the highest ratings.
 N/A denotes that the rating is not known.
 Each night's broadcast is divided into two 40-minute episodes with a commercial break in between.

Awards and nominations

Notes

References

External links
  
 
 
 

Korean Broadcasting System television dramas
2019 South Korean television series debuts
2020 South Korean television series endings
Korean-language television shows
Television series about families
South Korean romantic comedy television series
Television series by HB Entertainment